The county of Hertfordshire is divided into ten districts. The districts of Hertfordshire are Three Rivers, Watford, Hertsmere, Welwyn Hatfield, Broxbourne, East Hertfordshire, Stevenage, North Hertfordshire, St Albans, and Dacorum.

As there are 472 Grade II* listed buildings in the county they have been split into separate lists for each district.

 Grade II* listed buildings in Three Rivers
 Grade II* listed buildings in Watford
 Grade II* listed buildings in Hertsmere
 Grade II* listed buildings in Welwyn Hatfield
 Grade II* listed buildings in Broxbourne (borough)
 Grade II* listed buildings in East Hertfordshire
 Grade II* listed buildings in Stevenage
 Grade II* listed buildings in North Hertfordshire
 Grade II* listed buildings in the City and District of St Albans
 Grade II* listed buildings in Dacorum

See also
 Grade I listed buildings in Hertfordshire
 :Category:Grade II* listed buildings in Hertfordshire

References
National Heritage List for England